Thomas Morley was the Bishop of Marlborough from 1537 until 1561. He was a former Abbot of Stanley,  and was consecrated as Bishop on 4 November 1537.  His death is thought to have occurred in 1561. He is also recorded as Thomas Calne and Thomas Bickley.

Notes

Year of birth unknown
1561 deaths
Bishops of Marlborough
English abbots
16th-century English bishops